Dzoramut is a town in the Lori Province of Armenia. In 1988-1989 Armenian refugees from Azerbaijan settled in the village.

Demographics 
58 people lived in the village in 1886, and 169 Muslims in 1897. 271 Turkish-Tatars lived here in 1922, 334 people in 1926, and 382 people in 1931.

References

External links 

Populated places in Lori Province